Andrew Thomas Massey (born 20 October 1961) is an English former footballer who played as a midfielder for Millwall, Port Vale, Aldershot, Fisher Athletic, Bromley, and Erith & Belvedere. He scored 12 goals in 163 league games in a six-year career in the Football League, and won both the FA Youth Cup and Football League Group Cup with Millwall.

Career
Massey started his career with Millwall where he was an FA Youth Cup winner in 1979 after a 2–0 victory over Manchester City. The "Lions" finished 16th in the Third Division in 1980–81  and then ninth in 1981–82 under Peter Anderson's stewardship. Millwall finished 17th in 1982–83 and ninth again in 1983–84, and Massey played in the 3–2 victory over Lincoln City at Sincil Bank in the 1983 League Group Cup final. However, he fell out of favour with new manager George Graham. He was sent out to John Rudge's Port Vale on a one-month loan deal in March 1984. He played four Third Division games and scored a goal in 3–2 defeat to Rotherham United at Vale Park on 2 April. After returning to The Den he was involved in a swap deal which saw him join Aldershot and Les Briley go the other way. Ron Harris's "Shots" finished 13th in the Fourth Division in 1984–85, and then 16th in 1985–86 under Len Walker's stewardship. Massey scored three goals in 71 league games during his two years at the Recreation Ground. He later moved on to a handful of non-league sides, including: Fisher Athletic, Bromley (on loan) and Erith & Belvedere.

Career statistics
Source:

Honours
Millwall
FA Youth Cup: 1979
Football League Group Cup: 1983

References

1961 births
Living people
Footballers from New Cross
English footballers
Association football midfielders
Millwall F.C. players
Port Vale F.C. players
Aldershot F.C. players
Fisher Athletic F.C. players
Bromley F.C. players
Erith & Belvedere F.C. players
English Football League players
Southern Football League players